Danmarks Næste Topmodel, cycle 2 was the second individual cycle of the show.
The judging panel, consisting of Caroline Fleming, Uffe Buchard and Jacqueline Friis-Mikkelsen remained the same for the second cycle in a row. The final cast was increased up to 15.

Like in the final episode of cycle 1, the call out order at the elimination process is now random and every girl learns her verdict individually whether she makes it to the next round or not. This format has been adapted from Germany's Next Topmodel.

Among with the prizes was a modeling contract with Unique Model Management, the cover and a 10-page spread in Elle Magazine Denmark and the chance to become the face of L'Oreal Paris.

Julie Hasselby was crowned the winner of the season. Hasselby was the second lesbian winner of the franchise.

Contestants

Episode summaries

Episode 2
Photo of the Week: Carla Kruse
Eliminated: Camilla Sebens & Cecilie Nilsson

Episode 3
Photo of the Week: Nanna Liin Sørensen
Eliminated: Josefine Hewitt

Episode 4
Photo of the Week: Amalie Fischer
Eliminated: Zola Olsen	
Bottom two: Sara Abdelghani & Silvija Vukovic	
Eliminated: Sara Abdelghani

Episode 5
Photo of the Week: Johanna Kjærbo
Eliminated: Nanna Stenner

Episode 6
Photo of the Week: Julie Hasselby
Eliminated: Amalie Fischer

Episode 7
Photo of the Week: Julie Hasselby
Eliminated: Kimmi Rønnebæk	
Bottom two: Natasja Smith & Silvija Vukovic	
Eliminated: Silvija Vukovic

Episode 8
Photo of the Week: Nanna Liin Sørensen	
Eliminated: None

Episode 9
Photo of the Week: Julie Hasselby
Bottom two: Johanna Kjærbo & Shenna Salih	
Eliminated: Johanna Kjærbo

Episode 10
Eliminated outside of judging panel: Carla Kruse	& Shenna Salih
Bottom two:  Julie Hasselby & Natasja Smith
Eliminated:  Natasja Smith
Final two:  Julie Hasselby & Nanna Liin Sørensen	
Denmark's Next Top Model:  Julie Hasselby

Summaries

Results table

 The contestant won photo of the week
 The contestant was eliminated outside the judging panel
 The contestant was in danger of elimination
 The contestant was eliminated
 The contestant won the competition

Photo shoot guide
Episode 1 photo shoot: Promotional pictures (casting) 
Episode 2 photo shoot: Gossip magazine covers
Episode 3 photo shoot: Reebok campaign with male models
Episode 4 photo shoot: Splattered with paint
Episode 5 commercial: Pet Diet spider food with spider
Episode 6 photo shoot: The Butcher movie posters
Episode 7 photo shoot: Circus scenarios
Episode 8 photo shoot: Wicked Game inspired beach shoot
Episode 9 photo shoot: Lost in the desert
Episode 10 photo shoot: L'Oréal beauty shots

Post–Topmodel careers

Camilla Sebens has taken a couple of test shots until retired from modelling in 2014.
Cecilie Nilsson has taken a couple of test shots and currently runs the YSCN agency. Beside modeling, she appeared in the reality-show "Bikini Island" on TV3. 
Josefine Hewitt signed with Le Management and has taken a couple of test shots. She is also represent Denmark in the Miss Universe 2012. She retired from modelling in 2020.
Zola Olsen has appeared in the music videos "En Sang For Emma" by Marcus Smilez.
Nanna Stenner has taken a couple of test shots until retired from modelling in 2014.
Amalie Fischer has taken a couple of test shots and modeled for MOS Copenhagen, POP Copenhagen,...
Silvija Vukovic signed with CPH Wolves. She taken a couple of test shots and modeled for Steinum A/W 2012-13. Beside modeling, Vukovic appeared in several reality-show like "4-stjerners Middag" on Kanal 5 and "Et Ton Cash" on TV3. She is also compete on several beauty-pageant competitions like Miss Universe Denmark 2015 representing Frederiksberg and Miss United Continents 2016 representing Denmark. Vukovic retired from modelling in 2017.
Kimmi Rønnebæk signed with Unique Models. She taken a couple of test shots and modeled for MOS Copenhagen. She retired from modelling in 2014.
Johanna Kjærbo has taken a couple of test shots and walked in fashion shows during Copenhagen Fashion Week for Avia of Scandinavia A/W collection 2012-13, Pernille Krüger "Victim" collection SS16,... She has been modeled and shooting print work for Miinto, Delux Copenhagen, Pernille Krüger "Victim" collection SS16,... Beside modeling, she appeared in the music videos "Ku Godt" by Kesi. Kjærbo retired from modelling in 2017.
Shenna Salih signed with Dream Models and has taken a couple of test shots. Beside modeling, she appeared in several reality-show like "4-stjerners Middag" on Kanal 5 and "Tattoo Salonen" on TV3. She retired from modelling in 2014.
Natasja Smith signed with Unique Models and Metro Models. She has taken a couple of test shots, appeared on an editorials for Superior Online August 2012, Liv magazine,... and shooting print work for Octopus Copenhagen, Thi Thao Copenhagen SS15,... She is also represent Denmark in the Miss Grand International 2013, but withdrew before the preliminary show. She retired from modelling in 2016.
Nanna Liin Sørensen signed with 1st Option Model Management. She has taken a couple of test shots and appeared in the reality-show "4-stjerners Middag" on Kanal 5. She retired from modelling in 2014.
Julie Hasselby has collected her prizes. She has taken a couple of test shots, walked in fashion shows during Copenhagen Fashion Week 2011 and modeled for Beate Godager Autumn-Winter 2012-2013 lookbook, Creademic Academy collection,... She retired from modelling in 2018.

References

Danmarks Næste Topmodel
2011 Danish television seasons